Georgene Louis is an American attorney and politician who served as a member of the New Mexico House of Representatives for the 26th district from 2013 to 2023.

Early life and education
Louis was born and raised in the Acoma Pueblo. She earned a bachelor’s degree and Juris Doctor from the University of New Mexico.

Career 
Louis has worked in the field of tribal law. She participated in a seven-month candidate training called Emerge New Mexico. Five of its alumni were elected to office in New Mexico in 2012. As of 2015, Louis is one of five Native American legislators in the New Mexico House of Representatives.

Louis represented District 26, which includes part of West Albuquerque and is predominantly Latino. The district has a population of around 30,000 people, of whom 4% are Native American.

She was the chair of the House State Government, Elections, and Indian Affairs committees and was also a member of the Judiciary and Rules & Order of Business Committees. She was re-elected to a fifth term in 2020.

Louis is the general counsel of the Pueblo of Tesuque. On January 4, 2021, Louis announced her candidacy for the 2021 New Mexico's 1st congressional district special election. At the Democratic committee selection, she lost to fellow representative Melanie Stansbury.

Personal life 
Louis had her daughter, Jonisha, when she was a sophomore in high school. Louis and her daughter live in Albuquerque, New Mexico.

On February 14, 2022, Louis was booked into a Santa Fe County jail on an Aggravated DWI charge, in addition to being charged with "speeding, driving without insurance and failing to show proof of registration."

Honors
Inaugural Achievement Award, Indian Law Section, State Bar of New Mexico, 2013 (cite for this and following entries)
Emerging Democratic Woman of the Year, Emerge New Mexico, 2013
Toll Fellow, Council of State Governments, 2013
40 Under Forty Honoree, Albuquerque Business First, 2013
Award Nominee, American Council of Young Political Leaders, 2013

References

External links
 Government website 
 Campaign website

1978 births
21st-century American politicians
21st-century American women politicians
Candidates in the 2021 United States elections
Living people
Democratic Party members of the New Mexico House of Representatives
Native American state legislators in New Mexico
Native American women in politics
University of New Mexico alumni
Women state legislators in New Mexico
People from Acoma Pueblo
21st-century Native American women
21st-century Native Americans